The 1930–31 Northern Football League season was the 38th in the history of the Northern Football League, a football competition in Northern England.

Clubs

The league featured 12 clubs which competed in the last season, along with one new club:
 Trimdon Grange Colliery

League table

References

1930-31
4